Wayne Artman (November 24, 1936 – November 9, 2006) was an American sound engineer. He was nominated for an Academy Award in the category Best Sound for the film The Witches of Eastwick. He worked on over 130 films between 1973 and 2000.

Selected filmography
 The Witches of Eastwick (1987)

References

External links

1936 births
2006 deaths
American audio engineers
20th-century American engineers